James Marsland (born 28 August 1968) is a Scottish former footballer. He began his career with Kilpatrick Juveniles before signing 'senior' with Dumbarton. Here he would spend eight seasons.

References

External links

1968 births
Scottish footballers
Dumbarton F.C. players
Scottish Football League players
Living people
Association football defenders
Sportspeople from Dumbarton
Footballers from West Dunbartonshire